Rumi Matsui (松井るみ, born in Osaka, Japan) is a Japanese set designer and scenographer based in Tokyo. She is the president of Centreline Associates.

Biography 
In 1985 Rumi Matsui completed her BA in graphic design at Tama Art University and joined Shiki Theatre Company. This led her into further education in theatre design at Central School of Art and Design in London. 
After her return to Japan in 1990, Matsui began her career as a set designer and scenographer establishing Centreline Associates Inc. in 1991. She has designed over four hundred theatrical productions and won numerous awards including Yomiuri Drama Grand Prix for the best set designer and the Kinokuniya Drama Award. In 2004, her Broadway debut Pacific Overtures at Studio 54 was nominated for the Tony Award's Best Scenic Design of a Musical. The Fantasticks was taken to London's West End in 2010.
She has also designed a number of opera sets such as Junior Butterfly for the 52nd Puccini Festival at Torre del Lago Puccini in Italy and Tea: A Mirror of Soul at Santa Fe Opera in New Mexico. 
In recent years, she has been expanding her practice to concert set design, notably including Japanese pop group AKB48 at the National Athletic Stadium in 2014. Matsui also contributed the scenic design to Korin; a play inspired by ancient mythology about the origin of Japan, which was given as an offering to and performed at Kyoto's oldest Shinto shrine Kamigamo Jinja. 
Matsui was a member of the jurors for Prague Quadrennial '07 and she was listed as one of the Honorable Scenographers by OISTAT (International Organization of Scenographers, Theatre Architects and Technicians) in 2007.
Matsui is currently a guest instructor of set design at Tokyo University of the Arts, and remains the president of Centreline Associates Inc., one of the major theatre set design companies in Japan.

Selected works

Musical 
Rainbow Prelude  (2014), directed by Yukio Ueshima
The Addams Family (2014), directed by Akira Shirai
Anything Goes  (2013), directed by Kazuya Yamada
Mozart, l'opéra rock  (2013), directed by Philip McKinley
Hamlet (2012), directed by Tamiya Kuriyama
Gold –Camille and Rodin  (2011), directed by Akira Shirai
Piaf  (2011, 2013), directed by Akira Shirai
Dracula  (2011), directed by Toru Kikkawa
Gone With the Wind  (2011), directed by Kazuya Yamada
Only Yesterday  (2011), directed by Tamiya Kuriyama
The Fantasticks (2010), directed by Amon Miyamoto
Jane Eyre  (2009, 2012), directed by John Caird
Blood Brothers  (2009, 2010), directed by Glen Walford
Rudolf –the last kiss  (2008), directed by Amon Miyamoto
Sweeney Todd  (2007, 2011, 2013), directed by Amon Miyamoto
Here's Love  (2004, 2005), directed by Toru Kikkawa
Urinetown  (2004), directed by Amon Miyamoto
The Witches of Eastwick  (2003, 2005, 2008), directed by Kazuya Yamada
The Little Prince (2003, 2005), directed by Akira Shirai
Pacific Overtures (2000, 2002, 2004), directed by Amon Miyamoto

Play 
Mercury Fur (2015), directed by Akira Shirai
Sanada Ten Braves (2014), directed by Yukihiko Tsutsumi
Pygmalion (2013), directed by Keiko Miyata
Lost in Yonkers (2013), directed by Kōki Mitani
True West (2013), directed by Scott Elliott
Bun to Fun (2013), directed by Tamiya Kuriyama
Headache, Stiff Neck, Ichiyo Higuchi (2013), directed byTamiya Kuriyama
The Dresser (2013), directed by Kōki Mitani
Soldiers in the Tree (2013), directed by Tamiya Kuriyama
Sonan, (2012), directed by Yukiko Motoya
The King's Speech (2012), directed by Yumi Suzuki
Yabuhara, the Blind Master Minstrel (2012), directed by Tamiya Kuriyama
The Cherry Orchard (2012), directed by Kōki Mitani
The Sister (2011), directed by Masahiko Kawahara
Crazy Honey (2011), directed by Yukiko Motoya
Rain (2011), directed by Tamiya Kuriyama
Top Girls (2011), directed by Yumi Suzuki	
Jeanne d'Ark (2010), directed by Akira Shirai
Harper Regan (2010), directed by Keishi Nagatsuka
Macbeth (2010, 2013), directed by Mansai Nomura
The Seafarer (2009), directed by Tamiya Kuriyama
Sakurahime (2009), Kazuyoshi Kushida
Henry IV (2009), directed by Akira Shirai
Shun-kin (2008, 2009, 2010, 2013), directed by Simon McBurney
Kuni Nusubito (2007, 2009), directed by Mansai Nomura
Hysteria (2007), directed by Akira Shirai
The Fastest Clock in the Universe (2003), directed by Akira Shirai
Pitchfork Disney (2002), directed by Akira Shirai
The Elephant Man (2002), directed by Keiko Miyata

Opera 
Die tote Stadt (2014), directed by Tamiya Kuriyama
Lear (2013), directed by Tamiya Kuriyama
Die Fledermaus (2013), directed by Akira Shirai
La Damnation de Faust (2010), directed by Sakiko Oshima
Otello (2010), directed by Akira Shirai
La Traviata (2009), directed by Amon Miyamoto
Turandot (2008), directed by Amon Miyamoto
Tea: A Mirror of Soul (2007, 2010, 2013), directed byAmon Miyamoto
Daphne (2007), directed by Sakiko Oshima
White Nights (2006, 2009), directed by Akira Shirai
Junior Butterfly (2006, 2014), directed by Masahiko Shimada

Takarazuka Revue 
Star Troupe: South Pacific (2013), directed by Ryo Harada
Flower Troupe: Poetry of Love and Revolution - Andrea Chénier- (2013), directed by Keiko Ueda
Snow Troupe: Spring Lightning (2013), directed by Ryo Harada

Concert 
 AKB48: Spring Concerts (2014)
 AKB48: Summer Tour (2013)

Awards 
38th Kazuo Kikuta Drama Award (2013)
19th Yomiuri Grand Drama Award for Best Designer (2012)
15th Yomiuri Grand Drama Award for Best Designer (2008)
59th Tony Award Nominee for the Best Scenic Design of a Musical (2005)
Yomiuri Grand Drama Award for the Grand Prix of Best Designer (2002)
Kinokuniya Drama Award (2002)
Novi Sad International Theatre Festival Special Jury's Award (2001)
8th Yomiuri Grand Drama Award for Best Designer (2000)
Kisaku Ito Award for newcomers (1997)

References

External links 
 

Living people
Japanese artists
Japanese scenic designers
Broadway set designers
Year of birth missing (living people)